A Pocket for Corduroy is a 1978 children's book written and illustrated by Don Freeman. It was a sequel to his 1968 book Corduroy.

Plot
Lisa accidentally loses Corduroy, her teddy bear, at a laundromat. After a series of adventures, while Corduroy searches for material to make a pocket, he becomes trapped in a laundry basket until he is found the next morning by the laundromat's owner. Corduroy is reunited with Lisa, who promptly takes him home to sew a pocket onto his overalls so that Corduroy can carry a name card with him.

Adaptations
A Pocket for Corduroy was made into a short television movie in 1986. An American Sign Language (ASL) version of A Pocket for Corduroy was released through Scholastic Corporation/Weston Woods in 2009. This version includes the original story, artwork, voice-over, music and read along captions. The 2000 animated TV series Corduroy was based on A Pocket for Corduroy as well as its predecessor.

References

1978 children's books
American picture books
Children's fiction books
Books about bears
Fictional teddy bears
Sentient toys in fiction
Viking Press books